Colossal Order is a Finnish video game developer known for its business simulation game series Cities in Motion and for its city-builder Cities: Skylines. The company was founded in Tampere, Finland in 2009. Its publisher is Paradox Interactive. Paradox tests, markets, sells, distributes, and owns the copyright of all games by Colossal Order. The CEO of Colossal Order is Mariina Hallikainen.

History
Colossal Order was founded in the summer of 2009 by a group of game developers of the mobile game company Universomo. Mariina Hallikainen was hired from outside of Universomo as the CEO of the new company.

At first, Colossal Order had difficulties obtaining funding for its first game, the business simulation game Cities in Motion, that was already in development when the company was founded. Investors thought that Cities in Motion would not attract a large enough clientele. Instead of big investors, the first steps of the company were funded by Finnish public instruments – Centre for Economic Development, Transport and the Environment, Tekes, and DigiDemo finance of the Promotion Centre for Audiovisual Culture – as well as small private investors.

In its early phase, the company was coached by the Yritystalli program of the Tampere University of Technology, but advice was sought directly from experienced Finnish game development companies as well, specifically Remedy Entertainment and Frozenbyte. Upon being founded, Colossal Order compared dozens of publishers and ended up signing a publishing agreement with Paradox Interactive after over a year's worth of negotiations.

In October 2015, Colossal Order was awarded the Finnish Game Developer of the Year award at the  convention. The judges thanked Colossal Order for focusing: "from its inception ... on – in addition to developing games – also developing its business model".

Games
The relationship between Colossal Order and its publisher Paradox Interactive has been characterized as constructive. Colossal Order has the freedom to create games without limitations set by the publisher, bar those on schedules.

Unlike the game developers that founded it, Colossal Order does not develop mobile games. Instead, the company focuses on PC games. Employees of the company have their own internal wiki platform for developing games. Games by Colossal Order are known for their active modding communities. One of the programmers at the company works full-time on modding tools.

The best-known game of the company is the city-building game Cities: Skylines published on March 10, 2015. It competes with games of the SimCity and Cities XL series. Cities: Skylines got its first expansion pack, After Dark, on September 24, 2015. Its second expansion pack, Snowfall, came out on February 20, 2016. A third expansion pack, Natural Disasters, was released on November 29, 2016, the fourth expansion pack, Mass Transit, on May 18, 2017. The fifth expansion, Green Cities, came out on October 19, 2017, and the sixth expansion, Parklife was released on May 24, 2018. The seventh expansion, Industries, was released on October 23, 2018, and the eighth expansion, Campus, was released on May 21, 2019. The ninth expansion, Sunset Harbor, was released on March 26, 2020. The tenth expansion, Airports, was released on January 25, 2022. The eleventh and most recent expansion, Plazas and Promenades, was released on September 14, 2022.

List of games

References

External links
 

Video game companies established in 2009
Video game companies of Finland
Video game development companies
Companies based in Tampere
Finnish companies established in 2009